Robert Smithies (26 February 1948 – 5 November 2019) was an English rugby league player who played in the 1960s and 1970s.

Playing career
Smithies came to Balmain from the Illawarra competition in 1969.

He played three seasons with Balmain between 1969 and 1971, before moving to England to play for Hull KR for five years making 54 appearances plus 1 substitute appearance, scoring 22 tries for 66 points.

Smithies won a premiership with Balmain when he played full-back in the 1969 Grand Final.

Smithies played  in Hull Kingston Rovers' 16–13 victory over Wakefield Trinity in the 1974 Yorkshire County Cup Final during the 1974–75 season at Headingley Rugby Stadium, Leeds on Saturday 26 October 1974.

Death 
Smithies died on 5 November 2019, aged 71.

References

1948 births
2019 deaths
Balmain Tigers players
English rugby league players
Hull Kingston Rovers players
Place of death missing
Place of birth missing
Rugby league fullbacks
English emigrants to Australia